"Better Off Alone" is a song by Alice Deejay, the trance music project of Dutch producer DJ Jurgen in collaboration with Wessel van Diepen, Dennis van den Driesschen, Sebastiaan Molijn and Eelke Kalberg (Pronti & Kalmani). In 1997, the song was released as an instrumental by DJ Jurgen on Violent Records. Later releases of the track included vocals by Judith Pronk, who would later become an important part of the Alice Deejay project. The song was included on the project's debut album, Who Needs Guitars Anyway? (2000). The song is known for playing a key role in the development of the commercial trance sound, and has since been considered an electronic/trance music classic.

Production
The song was initially an instrumental track composed in 1997 by Jürgen "DJ Jurgen" Rijkers, Sebastiaan "Pronti" Moljin, and Eelke "Kalmani" Kahlberg at the Violent Studios 4045 complex in Hilversum, Netherlands. Violent Music and Violent Studios owners Dennis "Danski" Van Der Driesschen and Wessel "Delmundo" van Diepen had previously offered studio space for Pronti and Kalmani next to their 4045 complex. Before the production of "Better Off Alone", Pronti and Kalmani had worked on composing music for the label's other project the Vengaboys.

In post-production of the instrumental, Sebastiaan Molijn stated he invented the lyric "Do you think you're better off alone?" after his romantic partner had left him. Molijn stated that "I started humming the vocal melody while the track was playing and we decided to add vocals. It made the emotion of the song as real as it gets." Judith Pronk later served as singer for the Alice Deejay compositions of the song.  Pronti and Kalmani's official biography once stated that DJ Jurgen, "wanted to stay the underground DJ that he was, so the group Alice Deejay was formed." In 1999, the "Radio Edit" was produced.

Later in 1999, Sebastiaan Moljin and Eelke Kahlberg produced several remixes of the song which included the "Vocal Clubmix", "Pronti & Kalmani Vocal Remix", and the "Pronti & Kalmani Club Dub".

Composition
"Better Off Alone" is written in the key of G-sharp minor. The song is set in common time with a fast tempo of 137 beats per minute.  The song follows a chord progression of E–Dm–Gm–F, and the vocals span from B3 to G4.

With the turn of the century, "Better Off Alone" has been described as a turning point in the development of a commercialized techno sound. This sound is shared by related compositions such as "Blue (Da Ba Dee)" by Eiffel 65 that surfaced around the same time. Co-founder of Dash Berlin Jeffrey Sutorious stated, "It became such a huge chart hit around the world that many people categorised it as Euro Dance, when in fact it started out as vocal trance". Eelke Kalberg and Sebastiaan Molijn are Dash Berlin's other co-founders. Entertainment Weekly described the song as "techno-pop" while Spin described it as a "trance-fueled Eurodance".

Release

Single
The single was initially released as an instrumental single by DJ Jurgen in 1997 on Violent Music B.V.'s label Violent Records. Upon its release, there were only 500 vinyls pressed. After the single established credibility under DJ Jurgen's name, the vocal versions got re-released as "DJ Jurgen Presents Alice Deejay" as well as "Alice Deejay Featuring DJ Jurgen" in some countries. The vocal single later came to be of just Alice Deejay.

The track was released to dance clubs and became an international hit in clubs reaching number 2 on the Billboard club charts and a top ten club chart worldwide. The song then became a hit reaching number 2 in Canada, number 27 in the U.S. and number 2 in the UK. It went on to sell over 600,000 copies in the UK and become one of the country's best-selling singles of 1999, despite the radio edit not being on the commercial CD release. The song was in the top 100 best-selling singles in Australia for 2000 as compiled by the Australian Recording Industry Association.

Music videos
"Better Off Alone" is notable for having two versions of its music video. The original music video was directed by Olaf van Gerwen through the studio Blood Simple – who at the time directed videos for Sebastian Molijn and Eelke Kalberg's other music project the Vengaboys. In the first version of the video, a man travels in a Jeep through the Moroccan desert. His car stalls and is forced to walk on foot. He discards his items along the way such as a watch, a map and some vodka. In parallel, a woman is sitting on a couch in a living room singing the lyrics to the song while the man sees her in the desert. The man gets lost in the desert while intercut scenes of him and his girlfriend in love are shown. He takes off his broken dog tag while screaming. Because the dog tag is already broken and the girl has the second part probably means he is already dead and she is missing him. The video ends on his dead body being covered by the desert sand. The second version was directed by "Cousin Mike" from the 1711 Production Group. The second video was shot in Miami for Republic and Universal. The second version is interspersed with desert scenes from the original, but with added scenes where Judith Pronk, Mila Levesque and Angelique Versnel are dancing in a room with Moroccan decor. Sometimes just Pronk alone, wearing a blue dress with a veil.

Critical reception
The song was initially received with passiveness by some critics. J.D. Considine from The Baltimore Sun wrote in his review of Who Needs Guitars Anyway?, "Alice Deejay's sound is synth-driven and slightly retro, owing more to the frothy fun of '80s electropop than to the relentless thump of modern techno, and the songwriting is tuneful and hook-driven, lending an engaging, Ace of Base charm to the likes of "Better Off Alone"." Entertainment Weekly gave the song a B rating, describing it as having "catchy, throwaway results" with "barely there lyrics". Scottish Daily Record complimented its "great vocal and a pounding techno beat".

In retrospect the song garnered acclaim. Vibe magazine considering the song "a timeless track" in their 30 Dance Tracks from The '90s That Changed the Game. Complex magazine stated the song, "perfectly embodies the 1990s Eurodance/euro trance sound that took over clubs, and today we're hearing the big room house scene build upon what was started here" in their 10 Essential Eurodance Classics. Complex also stated that Sebastiaan Moljin and Eelke Kahlberg's production of trance music project Dash Berlin, is directly reflective of the song's influence on the modern day electronic music scene. In 2017, BuzzFeed listed the song at number 24 in their list of The 101 Greatest Dance Songs Of the '90s. Dash Berlin honorarily included the song in their top 5 greatest trance classics. Critic George McCarthy has described the song as being 'full of life: displaying an extensive range of raw emotional vulnerabilities that are unmatched by any other modern dance track, is a banger'.

Meagan Garvey of MTV referenced the song as an example of "Eurodance Nostalgia" and that the cult status of the song is "mostly retroactive". Garvey stated that songs such as "Better Off Alone", "left you with an aching sensation, as if something had been left unsaid. The undercurrent of melancholy seemed more akin to mid-'90s tracks like La Bouche's "Where Do You Go" or Haddaway's "What Is Love," dance tracks built around unanswerable questions."

Track listings

Dutch, Canadian, Australian, and New Zealand maxi-CD single
 "Better Off Alone" (radio edit) – 3:36 (3:38)
 "Better Off Alone" (vocal club mix) – 6:36 (6:53)
 "Better Off Alone" (Signum remix) – 7:46 (7:49)
 "Better Off Alone" (Pronti & Kalmani vocal remix) – 7:04 (7:07)
 "Better Off Alone" (Pronti & Kalmani club dub) – 6:46 (6:52)
 "Better Off Alone" (Mark van Dale with Enrico remix) – 9:27 (9:28)
 Canadian durations are noted in parentheses

European maxi-CD single
 "Better Off Alone" (radio edit) – 3:36
 "Better Off Alone" (vocal club mix) – 6:51
 "Better Off Alone" (Signum remix) – 7:46
 "Better Off Alone" (instrumental mix) – 6:36
 "Better Off Alone" (Pronti & Kalmani vocal remix) – 7:04
 "Better Off Alone" (club dub) – 6:46

Scandinavian CD single
 "Better Off Alone" (radio edit) – 3:36
 "Better Off Alone" (vocal club mix) – 6:36

UK CD and 12-inch single
 "Better Off Alone" (vocal club mix) – 6:36
 "Better Off Alone" (Signum remix) – 6:21
 "Better Off Alone" (DJ Jam X and De Leon's Dumonde remix) – 6:42

UK cassette single
 "Better Off Alone" (UK short cut) – 2:53
 "Better Off Alone" (vocal club mix) – 6:36
 "Better Off Alone" (Pronti & Kalmani vocal remix) – 7:04

US 12-inch single
A1. "Better Off Alone" (vocal club mix) – 6:36
A2. "Better Off Alone" (Jam & Dumonde remix) – 6:42
B1. "Better Off Alone" (Mark van Dale with Enrico remix) – 9:27
B2. "Better Off Alone" (original edit) – 3:32

Canadian 12-inch single
A1. "Better Off Alone" (vocal club mix) – 6:53
A2. "Better Off Alone" (Signum remix) – 7:49
B1. "Better Off Alone" (Pronti & Kalmani vocal remix) – 7:07
B2. "Better Off Alone" (Mark van Dale with Enrico remix) – 9:28

Charts

Weekly charts

Year-end charts

Certifications

Release history

Cover versions and samples
In 2001, the Buck A Day company used a cover of the song using the lyrics "Do you think you really want a clone" in their commercials to promote buying a genuine IBM computer over a clone.

In 2007, New Jersey rock group Paulson released a rock cover of the song on their Calling on You EP.

In 2008, the main melody of the song was sampled by producer Johnny Juliano in "Say Yeah" by Wiz Khalifa, which added the Roland TR-808 as well as drum machine claps to the existing melody. Hip hop and trap producer AraabMuzik stated that sampling the song was initially what led him to sampling "trance and really upbeat dance music". The song was sampled by him in "South Beach" by 40 Cal featuring Duke Da God.

In 2011, Dutch DJ and producer Laidback Luke introduced an electro house remix of the song in the compilation Cream Ibiza: Super You & Me, marketed as a 2011 "Summer anthem".

In 2011, Witch house group Salem covered the song on their EP I'm Still in the Night.

French producer David Guetta was authorized to use the main melody (or "hook") of the song. The main melody of the song was sampled in Guetta's 2013 song "Play Hard" featuring Ne-Yo and Akon. The recording was later included in the reboot album Nothing but the Beat 2.0. Some sources have described this "heavy" sampling as an example of the "gray area in the world of music plagiarism". Despite the authorized use of the melody, some sources have stated that this poses the question of "How much sampling is too much sampling?".

Lindsay Lohan's 2019 track "Xanax" is built around a slowed-down sample of the song.

Canadian pop band Purity Ring also released a cover of the song on 29 September 2020.

Dutch DJ San Holo recorded a guitar version of the song, and published it on his Twitter feed on 2 August 2021.

In 2021, Trevor Daniel interpolated the chorus on his song "Alone". That same year, Farruko interpolated it on his song "El Incomprendido", from his album La 167.

Døves and Wicca Phase Springs Eternal, of the rap collective GothBoiClique, remixed the song for the closing track of their Trance inspired SoundCloud DJ set ULTRACLUB4k.

In 2022, Darwin Núñez joined Liverpool F.C. from S.L. Benfica. Soon after his signing, a chant about him set to the tune of Better Off Alone was popularised on social media.

References

1997 songs
1999 debut singles
Alice Deejay songs
Jive Records singles
Positiva Records singles
Number-one singles in Scotland
Republic Records singles
Songs about heartache
Songs about loneliness
Virgin Records singles